Epigomphus paulsoni is a species of dragonfly in the family Gomphidae. It is endemic to Mexico's Chiapas state. Its natural habitats are subtropical or tropical moist lowland forests and rivers. It is threatened by habitat loss.

References

Gomphidae
Endemic insects of Mexico
Taxonomy articles created by Polbot
Insects described in 1981